Moratinos may refer to

Moratinos, Palencia, a municipality in the province of Palencia, Spain
José Lebrún Moratinos (1919-2001), Archbishop of Caracas, Venezuela in 1980-1995
Miguel Ángel Moratinos (born 1951), Spanish diplomat and politician